Al-Atnah is a Syrian village in the Al-Qutayfah District of the Rif Dimashq Governorate. According to the Syria Central Bureau of Statistics (CBS), Al-Atnah had a population of 1,897 in the 2004 census. Its inhabitants are predominantly Sunni Muslims.

References

Bibliography 

Populated places in Al-Qutayfah District